The 1955 NCAA Swimming and Diving Championships were contested in March 1955 at Billings Natatorium at Miami University in Oxford, Ohio at the 19th annual NCAA-sanctioned swim meet to determine the team and individual national champions of men's collegiate swimming and diving in the United States. 

Ohio State retained the national title, the Buckeyes' ninth, after finishing thirty-nine points ahead of Michigan and Yale in the team standings.

Team standings
Note: Top 10 only
(H) = Hosts
Full results

See also
List of college swimming and diving teams

References

NCAA Division I Men's Swimming and Diving Championships
NCAA Swimming And Diving Championships
NCAA Swimming And Diving Championships
NCAA Swimming And Diving Championships